Paula Louise Piechotta (born 19 September 1986) is a German politician of Alliance 90/The Greens and a radiologist. She has been a member of the Bundestag since the 2021 elections.

Early life and education
Piechotta was born 1986 in the East German city of Gera as a daughter of two theology students. She studied medicine and molecular medicine at the Friedrich Schiller University in Jena and earned her doctorate. She lives in Leipzig and works as a radiologist at the MedVZ of Leipzig University Hospital.

Political career
Piechotta was a member of the youth organization of Alliance 90/The Greens and joined the party Alliance 90/The Greens in 2010. In the 2021 German federal election she ran for a direct mandate in the district Leipzig II and became second with 18.4% of the vote behind Sören Pellmann (DIE LINKE).

In parliament, Piechotta has since been serving on the Budget Committee, where she is her parliamentary group's rapporteur on the annual budget of the Federal Ministry for Digital and Transport and of the Federal Ministry of Health. In the Audit Committee, Piechotta is the chairwoman of Alliance 90/The Greens parliamentary group and rapporteur for the Federal Ministry of Defense.

As a deputy member of the Health Committee, Piechotta is rapporteur for medical devices, pharmacies and pharmaceuticals. Furthermore, she is a deputy member of the Committee on Education, Research and Technology Assessment.

References 

Living people
1986 births
Members of the Bundestag 2021–2025
21st-century German politicians
21st-century German women politicians
Female members of the Bundestag